Indirect presidential elections were held in El Salvador on 29 April 1982. The Legislative Assembly voted on three candidates nominated by the armed forces. Álvaro Alfredo Magaña Borja, leader of the Democratic Action, was elected by 36 votes to 17, ahead of the Nationalist Republican Alliance (ARENA) candidate.

Roberto D'Aubuisson accused Jaime Abdul Gutiérrez Avendaño of imposing on the Assembly "his personal decision to put Álvaro Alfredo Magaña Borja in the presidency" in spite of a "categorical no" from the ARENA deputies. Magaña was sworn into office on 2 May.

Results

Of the seven abstaining votes, four were from PCN members, two from National Republican Alliance members and one from a Salvadoran Popular Party member.

References

Bibliography
Motley, Langhorne A. Elections in El Salvador: August 3, 1983. Washington, D.C.: Department of State. 1983.
Political Handbook of the world, 1972. New York, 1973. 

Presidential elections in El Salvador
President
El Salvador
El Salvador